The 1931–32 Segunda División season saw 10 teams participate in the second flight Spanish league. Betis was promoted to Primera División. Catalunya was relegated to Tercera División.

Teams

Final table

Results

External links
LFP website

Segunda División seasons
2
Spain